Tiffany Keep (born 15 October 2000) is a South African professional racing cyclist. She rode in the women's road race at the 2019 UCI Road World Championships in Yorkshire, England. She competed at the 2019 African Games and she won the gold medal in the women's mountain bike cross-country Olympic event. She was also part of the team that won the gold medal in the women's team road time trial event.

References

2000 births
Living people
South African female cyclists
Place of birth missing (living people)
Competitors at the 2019 African Games
African Games medalists in cycling
African Games gold medalists for South Africa
21st-century South African women